Robert F. Bauer (born February 22, 1952) is an American attorney who served as White House Counsel under President Barack Obama.

Early life and education
Born in New York City into a Jewish family, Bauer graduated from Phillips Exeter Academy in 1970. He earned a Bachelor of Arts degree from Harvard College in 1973, and his Juris Doctor from the University of Virginia School of Law in 1976.

Career
Bauer was President Obama's personal attorney and the general counsel of the Barack Obama 2008 presidential campaign. He has also previously served as the general counsel to the Democratic National Committee, and had advised President Obama since 2005.

As general counsel for the 2008 campaign, Bauer asked the Justice Department to investigate the officers and donors of American Issues Project after it ran a negative ad about Obama.

In November 2009, he was named to be the next White House Counsel, upon the resignation of Gregory Craig.

On June 2, 2011, the White House Press Office stated that Bauer would be returning to private practice at Perkins Coie, and that Principal Deputy Counsel to the President Kathryn Ruemmler (his deputy, in that office since January 2010 and before that since January 2009 as Principal Associate Deputy U.S. Attorney General) would succeed him. The position, because it is part of the Executive Office staff that personally advises the President and is not an agency or Cabinet department or military head, does not require Senate confirmation despite the prominence of the office.

Bauer returned to private practice to again represent the president's election team and the Democratic National Committee. "Bob was a critical member of the White House team," Mr. Obama said. "He has exceptional judgment, wisdom, and intellect, and he will continue to be one of my close advisers."

Obama chose Bauer and Benjamin L. Ginsberg, a Republican, in 2013 to co-chair the Presidential Commission on Election Administration, a yearlong investigation into voting problems. Their findings, "The American Voting Experience: Report and Recommendations of the Presidential Commission on Election Administration," were published in 2014.

Bauer serves as Professor of the Practice and Distinguished Scholar in Residence at New York University School of Law. He teaches classes including "The Role of the Lawyer in Public Life" and "Political Reform".

Bauer assisted with vetting efforts for the selection of Joe Biden's running mate in the 2020 presidential election.

During the Joe Biden 2020 presidential campaign, Bauer participated in mock debate sessions with Biden, impersonating the Republican candidate Donald Trump.

Bauer serves as the co-chair of the bipartisan commission to study reforms to the US Supreme Court and the federal judiciary. [12]

Personal life
Bauer is married to Anita Dunn, the former director of communications at the White House. He has four children, two daughters-in-law, a son-in-law, and three grandchildren. In 2008, Bauer and Dunn were described as Washington's new "power couple" by Newsweek magazine.

Bibliography 
 After Trump - Reconstructing the Presidency. Bob Bauer and Jack Goldsmith. Lawfare Institute/Lawfare Press. September 2020.

References

External links
 Biography of Robert Bauer, Perkins Coie

1952 births
21st-century American Jews
Harvard College alumni
Jewish American attorneys
Living people
People associated with Perkins Coie
Phillips Exeter Academy alumni
University of Virginia School of Law alumni
White House Counsels